Thomas Dean Dozier (born September 5, 1961) is a former American Major League Baseball pitcher. He played for the Oakland Athletics during the  season.

References

Major League Baseball pitchers
Oakland Athletics players
Baseball players from California
1961 births
Living people
People from San Pablo, California
Johnson City Cardinals players
Albany-Colonie Yankees players
Gastonia Cardinals players
Springfield Cardinals players
St. Petersburg Cardinals players
Omaha Royals players
Tacoma Tigers players
Greenville Braves players
Richmond Braves players
Huntsville Stars players
Richmond High School (Richmond, California) alumni
African-American baseball players